Calypso Ezili is a character appearing in American comic books published by Marvel Comics. The character is usually depicted as an enemy of the superhero Spider-Man. She is a voodoo priestess who utilizes magic potions, and the occasional lover and partner of Kraven the Hunter.

Ariana DeBose will portray Calypso in the Sony's Spider-Man Universe film Kraven the Hunter.

Publication history
Calypso first appeared in Amazing Spider-Man #209 and was created by Denny O'Neil and Alan Weiss.

Calypso initially appeared as a minor character The Amazing Spider-Man #209 and Peter Parker, The Spectacular Spider-Man #65, where  she was an ally of Spider-Man's enemy Kraven the Hunter. After Kraven's death, Calypso bewitched the Lizard into helping her attack Spider-Man in Spider-Man Vol. 1, #1-5, then made guest appearances in Daredevil Vol. 1, #310-311 and Daredevil Annual Vol. 1, #9. Calypso next appeared in Web of Spider-Man Vol. 1, #109-110 and Spider-Man Annual 1997, and was killed off in a storyline that spanned The Spectacular Spider-Man Vol. 1, #249-253.

Fictional character biography
Calypso is a nameless voodoo priestess of Haitian nationality. She was a psychopathic woman who was associated with Kraven the Hunter. Calypso seemed to enjoy driving Kraven into fits of rage and furthering his hatred of Spider-Man which ultimately led to Kraven's suicide in the "Kraven's Last Hunt" storyline.

When artist Todd McFarlane started writing the new Spider-Man comic in 1990, his opening five-issue story arc "Torment" featured Calypso as the main antagonist, whom McFarlane transformed into a dangerous threat for Spider-Man. The explanation for Calypso's supernatural powers was the sacrifice of her younger sister. She used her abilities to hold Lizard in her grasp and the two nearly succeeded in murdering Spider-Man. However, the webslinger managed to beat them both and Calypso is apparently killed.

Calypso resurfaces abducting Haitian refugees, turning some into zombie slaves and selling the rest back to her homeland's government. Her actions bring her into conflict with Daredevil and his Infinity War doppelganger, Hellspawn. Calypso briefly enthralls Daredevil, but he is able to break free of her control, and she seemingly dies yet again when the spirits of those she turned into zombies overwhelm her. Cheating death once more, Calypso flees to New Orleans, where her obsession with necromancy leads her to the resting place of Simon Garth, a self-aware zombie. Reviving Garth, Calypso tests his abilities and pits him against Hellspawn, though he eventually breaks free of her control and wanders off, leaving one of his Amulets of Damballah with Calypso.

Calypso subsequently breaks into the Vault and attempts to make the incarcerated Lizard her servant again, but he resists and mauls her. The Amulet of Damballah, which Calypso transferred her soul into while dying, ends up in the possession of Glory Grant, who Calypso possesses. Despite interference from Spider-Man, Garth, and Shotgun, Calypso is successfully able to exhume her own corpse and revive herself with the Amulet of Damballah.

Commanding a squad of savages, she later attacks Spider-Man and Alyosha Kravinoff, the son of the original Kraven the Hunter. Desiring revenge for losing Sergei, she uses her powers to drive Spider-Man and Alyosha into fighting each other. Spider-Man and Alyosha fight off her spell and shared a handshake. Alyosha says that he will hold Calypso at his mansion, so the villainess can tell him about his long-lost father. However, Alyosha kills Calypso instead.

Powers and abilities
Calypso was well-versed in the religion and practice of voodoo. She often used voodoo drums, potions, and charms. Calypso used mind control, resurrection, and poisons.

Other versions
An issue of What If? which asked the question "What If Spider-Man Killed the Lizard?" had Calypso in it. When Spider-Man is forced to kill the Lizard in an alternate version of the "Torment" story-arc, Calypso approaches the Lizard's distraught son Billy Connors and offers him the chance to get revenge on Spider-Man via a potion that will make him "just like daddy".

In other media

Television
 A character inspired by and nicknamed Calypso named Dr. Mariah Crawford appears in Spider-Man: The Animated Series, voiced by Susan Beaubian. This version is a research scientist who was engaged to Sergei Kravinoff before a serum made by a colleague transformed him into Kraven the Hunter. Throughout the series, she assists Spider-Man and Kraven in their adventures, such as creating a cure for the former's Man-Spider mutation, until she contracts an African plague she was helping to fight. In an effort to save her, Kraven injected her with the same serum that she used on him. However, upon their return to New York, Crawford mutates into a feral monster. Eventually, Kraven joins forces with Spider-Man and Black Cat to subdue Crawford and administer a cure created by Dr. Curt Connors, which partially restores Crawford's human form and fully restores her reasoning. Accepting what she has become, she and Kraven leave New York for the wilderness of Africa.
 Calypso appears in The Spectacular Spider-Man episode "Destructive Testing", voiced by Angela Bryant.

Film
Calypso is set to appear in the Sony's Spider-Man Universe film Kraven the Hunter, portrayed by Ariana DeBose.

Video games
 Calypso appears as a secret boss in Spider-Man 2, voiced by Angela V. Shelton.
 Calypso appears in Spider-Man 3, voiced again by Angela V. Shelton. She assists Kraven the Hunter by providing him with various potions and mutating the Lizard into an even larger, more monstrous form.
 A Marvel Noir-inspired incarnation of Calypso appears as a boss in the Nintendo DS version of Spider-Man: Shattered Dimensions, voiced by Jennifer Hale. She uses a fragment of the Tablet of Order and Chaos to raise an army of zombies in the hopes of reviving Kraven, but is eventually defeated by Spider-Man Noir.

References

External links
 Calypso at Marvel Wiki
 Calypso at Comic Vine
 Calypso at Samruby.com
 The Women of Marvel Comics Calypso Page
 Profile at Spiderfan.org
 Calypso at the Appendix to the Marvel Handbook

Characters created by Dennis O'Neil
Comics characters introduced in 1980
Fiction about Haitian Vodou
Fictional characters with spirit possession or body swapping abilities
Fictional Haitian people
Fictional hypnotists and indoctrinators
Fictional necromancers
Fictional priests and priestesses
Marvel Comics characters who use magic
Marvel Comics female supervillains
Spider-Man characters